Waqar Ahmed (born 1 April 1980) is a Pakistani first-class cricketer who played for Peshawar cricket team.

References

External links
 

1980 births
Living people
Pakistani cricketers
Peshawar cricketers
Pakistan Telecommunication Company Limited cricketers
Cricketers from Peshawar